The 2020–21 Tulane Green Wave men's basketball team represents Tulane University during the 2020–21 NCAA Division I men's basketball season. The Green Wave, led by second-year head coach Ron Hunter, play their home games at Devlin Fieldhouse in New Orleans, Louisiana, as seventh-year members of the American Athletic Conference. They finished the season 10-13, 4-12 in AAC Play to finish in 10th place. They defeated Tulsa in the first round of the AAC tournament before losing in the quarterfinals to Houston.

Previous season 
The Green Wave 12–18, 4–14 in AAC play to finish in 12th place. They entered as the No. 12 seed in the AAC tournament, which was ultimately cancelled due to the coronavirus pandemic.

Offseason

Departures

Incoming Transfers

2020 recruiting class 

Tulane will also add Preferred Walk-on Ben Callahan-Gold, a 6'7" swingman from Northfield Mount Hermon School. Ben is the son of comedian Judy Gold.

Preseason

AAC preseason media poll

On October 28, The American released the preseason Poll and other preseason awards

Roster

Schedule and results

COVID-19 impact

Due to the ongoing COVID-19 pandemic, the Green Wave's schedule is subject to change, including the cancellation or postponement of individual games, the cancellation of the entire season, or games played either with minimal fans or without fans in attendance and just essential personnel.

The game vs. Tulsa scheduled for February 10th was moved to Tulsa.

Schedule

|-
!colspan=12 style=| Regular season
|-

|-
!colspan=12 style=| AAC tournament
|-

Awards and honors

American Athletic Conference honors

All-AAC Third Team
Jaylen Forbes

Source

References

Tulane Green Wave men's basketball seasons
Tulane
Tulane
Tulane